Eighties may refer to:

 1980s, the decade
 "Eighties" (song), a 1984 song by Killing Joke
 The Eighties (miniseries), a 2016 documentary miniseries

See also
80 (disambiguation)
List of decades